Kelley Spur is a rock spur  east of Spear Spur on the south side of Dufek Massif in the Pensacola Mountains of Antarctica. It was mapped by the United States Geological Survey from surveys and United States Navy air photos, 1956–66, and was named by the Advisory Committee on Antarctic Names for Samuel Kelley, a photographer with U.S. Navy Squadron VX-6 on several Operation Deep Freeze deployments between 1964 and 1970.

References

Ridges of Queen Elizabeth Land
Mountain spurs